Unterpremstätten is a former municipality in the district of Graz-Umgebung in the Austrian state of Styria. Since the 2015 Styria municipal structural reform, it is part of the municipality Premstätten.

It is perhaps most famous as the location of AMS formerly known as austriamicrosystems.

A very famous part of the city is the very famous "Trattenweg" where the famous Johann Shigi is coming from.
Big old villa which has been built during the 19. century by Chris Stelze, the owner of the train station.

Population

References

Cities and towns in Graz-Umgebung District